Cedrela angustifolia is a species of tree in the mahogany family, Meliaceae. Local common names include cedro de Tucumán, cedro bayo, cedro coya, and cedro del cerro. It is native to South America, where it occurs in Argentina, Bolivia and Peru.

This is a species of mountain forests. It easily colonizes disturbed habitat, forming dense canopy. These stands still occur in Bolivia, and the tree is common in parts of Argentina. However, it is a valuable timber tree. Some populations have faced substantial declines, and it is considered to be an endangered species.

Forests of southern Perú are reported to have been in pre-colonial times composed largely of Andean cedar, which were over time depleted. One historical tree, purported to be more than 300 years old, remains in the courtyard of the Monasterio Hotel in Cusco. 
There is at this time no known effort to revive this species within Perú. Non-native eucalyptus trees are prized for their rapid growth, and are used throughout the area for both timber and fuel.

References

angustifolia
Trees of Argentina
Trees of Bolivia
Trees of Brazil
Trees of Paraguay
Trees of Peru
Endangered flora of South America
Taxonomy articles created by Polbot
Taxobox binomials not recognized by IUCN